Ardashir Mirza Rukn al-Dawla (1807-1866) was a prince of Persia's Qajar dynasty, and the governor of the Arabistan, Bakhtiaristan and Luristan provinces of Persia.

See also
 List of deaths through alcohol

References 

Qajar princes
1807 births
1866 deaths
Alcohol-related deaths in Iran
People from Tabriz
Qajar governors of Gilan